The Detroit Free Press is the largest daily newspaper in Detroit, Michigan, US. The Sunday edition is titled the Sunday Free Press. It is sometimes referred to as the Freep (reflected in the paper's web address, www.freep.com). It primarily serves Wayne, Oakland, Macomb, Livingston, Washtenaw, and Monroe counties.

The Free Press is also the largest city newspaper owned by Gannett, which also publishes USA Today. The Free Press has received ten Pulitzer Prizes and four Emmy Awards. Its motto is "On Guard for  Years".

In 2018, the Detroit Free Press received two Salute to Excellence awards from the National Association of Black Journalists.

History

1831–1989: Competitive newspaper
The newspaper was launched by John R. Williams and his uncle, Joseph Campau, and was first published as the Democratic Free Press and Michigan Intelligencer on May 5, 1831. It was renamed to Detroit Daily Free Press in 1835, becoming the region's first daily newspaper. Williams printed the first issues on a Washington press he purchased from the discontinued Oakland Chronicle of Pontiac. It was hauled from Pontiac in a wagon over rough roads to a building at Bates and Woodbridge streets in Detroit. The hand-operated press required two men and could produce 250 pages per hour. Sheldon McKnight became the first publisher with his uncle John Pitts Sheldon as the editor.

In the 1850s, the paper was developed into a leading Democratic Party–aligned publication under the ownership of Wilbur F. Storey.  Storey left for the Chicago Times in 1861, taking much of the staff with him. In the 1870s ownership passed to William E. Quinby, who continued its Democratic leanings and established a London, England edition.

In 1940, the Knight Newspapers (later Knight Ridder) purchased the Free Press.  During the next 20 years, the Free Press competed in the southeastern Michigan market with The Detroit News and the Detroit Times, until the Times was purchased and closed by The Detroit News on November 7, 1960. The Free Press was delivered and sold as a night paper, with home deliveries made after 7:00pm until around 1966. A morning "Blue Streak Edition" was available at news stands beginning around 1965, meaning the Free Press actually printed two editions per day. During that period The Detroit News was sold and delivered as an afternoon newspaper.

1989–present: Joint operating agreement
In 1989, the paper entered into a one hundred-year joint operating agreement with its rival, combining business operations while maintaining separate editorial staffs. The combined company is called the Detroit Media Partnership. The two papers also began to publish joint Saturday and Sunday editions, though the editorial content of each remained separate. At the time, the Detroit Free Press was the tenth-highest circulation paper in the United States, and the combined Detroit News and Free Press was the country's fourth-largest Sunday paper.

On July 13, 1995, Newspaper Guild–represented employees of the Free Press and News and the pressmen, printers and Teamsters working for the "Detroit Newspapers" distribution arm went on strike. By October, about 40% of the editorial staffers had crossed the picket line, and many trickled back over the next months while others stayed out for the two and a half years of the strike. The strike was resolved in court three years later, and the unions remain active at the paper, representing a majority of the employees under their jurisdiction.

In 1998, the Free Press vacated its former headquarters in downtown Detroit and moved to offices into The Detroit News building and began to operate from its new offices in that building on June 26 of that year.

On August 3, 2005, Knight Ridder sold the Free Press to the Gannett Company, which had previously owned and operated The Detroit News. Gannett, in turn, sold The News  to MediaNews Group; Gannett continues to be the managing partner in the papers' joint operating agreement.

The Free Press resumed publication of its own Sunday edition, May 7, 2006, without any content from The News, other than that The News would print its editorial page in the Sunday Free Press.

On December 16, 2008, Detroit Media Partnership (DMP) announced a plan to limit weekday home delivery for both dailies to Thursday and Friday only. On other weekdays the paper sold at newsstands would be smaller, about 32 pages, and redesigned. This arrangement went into effect March 30, 2009.

The Free Press entered a news partnership with CBS owned-and-operated station WWJ-TV channel 62 in March 2009 to produce a morning news show called First Forecast Mornings. Prior to the partnership, WWJ aired absolutely no local newscast at all.

In February 2014, the DMP announced its offices along with those of the Free Press and The Detroit News would occupy six floors in both the old and new sections of the former Federal Reserve building at 160 West Fort Street. The partnership expected to place signs on the exterior similar to those on the former offices.  The move took place beginning in October 2014.

Ownership changes
In June 2015, Gannett split itself into two companies. The company's television broadcasters and digital publishers became part of a new company known as Tegna Inc. while its traditional print publishers became part of a new Gannett.

In November 2019, the newspaper announced it would cut four staff positions ahead of the GateHouse Media conglomerate completing its purchase of Gannett. The Gannett board finalized the purchase agreement on November 19, 2019.

Other Free Press publications
 Screen & Radio Weekly (1934–1940)
 The Detroit Almanac:  300 Years of Life in the Motor City (2001). Peter Gavrilovich and Bill McGraw, editors.

Notable people

 Mitch Albom
 Edward A. Batchelor
 Jack Berry
 Donna Britt
 Frank Bruni
 Mike Downey
 Joe Falls
 David Gilkey
 Robin Givhan
 Susan Goldberg
 Ellen Goodman
 Gary Graff
 Sam Greene
 Edgar Guest
 Dick Guindon
 Ken Hamblin
 Stephen Henderson
 Jemele Hill
 Lee Hills
 Royce Howes
 Clark Hoyt
 Joe S. Jackson
 David Cay Johnston
 Dorothy Misener Jurney
 Michelle Kaufman
 David Lawrence Jr.
 John C. Lodge
 Kurt Luedtke
 Myra MacPherson
 Dori J. Maynard
 Eric Millikin
 Elvis Mitchell
 Al Neuharth
 Jack Ohman
 Rob Parker
 William E. Quinby
 Rochelle Riley
 James Risen
 Gene Roberts
 Neal Rubin
 Lyall Smith
 Jennie O. Starkey
 Wilbur F. Storey
 Joe Stroud
 Neely Tucker
 David Turnley
 Rob Wagner
 Lewis Walter
 Taro Yamasaki

See also

Media in Detroit

References

External links

 Official website
 Gannett subsidiary profile of the Detroit Free Press
 The Detroit Free Press Building
 Detroit Newspaper Partnership

 
Newspapers published in Detroit
Gannett publications
Pulitzer Prize-winning newspapers
Publications established in 1831
Pulitzer Prize for Public Service winners